Brain is a medical thriller written by Robin Cook. It describes how a future generation of computers will work hard-wired to human brains.

Plot
The story starts with a girl Katherine Collins going to a private clinic for a pap smear but these people anesthetize her and steal her brain for a secret military project. She is placed in a vat of liquid and her brain is connected to a computer. The same thing happens to other patients too.

The protagonist Dr. Martin Philips, a doctor in neuroradiology at the NYC medical center is involved in creating a self-diagnostic x-ray machine, along with William Michaels, who is a researcher graduating from MIT and also head of the department of artificial intelligence. Dr. Philips's girlfriend and colleague Dr. Denise Sanger (28 years old) is also involved in the same hospital. Philips and Sanger both find a secret conspiracy in the hospital to steal patients' brains without their consent. They uncover details and find that though they'd suspected Mannerheim, the prima donna neurosurgeon, the real villain is the soft-spoken AI researcher Michaels and his military backers. Dr. Philips blows the whistle and seeks political asylum in Sweden.

References 

1980 American novels
Novels by Robin Cook
American thriller novels
Medicine and health in fiction